Kylie Auldist is an Australian singer, best known as the singer of the Bamboos and Cookin' on 3 Burners. She has also released five solo albums.

Career
Auldist recorded her first song at the age of six. She is half Samoan. She moved from Broken Hill to Melbourne to pursue a career as a singer. She performed as a backing singer both live and on studio recordings with Renee Geyer and Jimmy Barnes. She also worked with the groups Curtis Late, Secret Masters, Small Fish Deep Sea, and Megabias, as well as Polyester, whose guitarist, Lance Ferguson, also played with funk group the Bamboos. She officially joined The Bamboos in 2006, debuting on stage at Meredith Music Festival in a late night set.

In 2008 she travelled with the band to the UK, where she was immediately signed to Brighton record label Tru Thoughts. Auldist recorded vocals for the 2009 Cookin' on 3 Burners song "This Girl", which went to number one on the iTunes R&B chart in the UK.

In 2012, Auldist released her third full-length for Tru Thoughts, entitled Still Life.

At the Music Victoria Awards of 2013, Auldist won Best Soul, Funk, R'n'B and Gospel Album for Still Life.

In 2014 she performed on Katie Noonan's album Songs That Made Me, which debuted at number 7 on the ARIA compilation chart.

Auldist performed three sets at Woodford Folk Festival in December 2014.

In 2016, Auldist's vocals on "This Girl" with Cookin' on 3 Burners, remixed by Kungs, charted in the United States, France, Germany, the United Kingdom, Belgium, the Netherlands and Australia.

Personal life
Auldist is married and has a child. They live in Glenroy, Victoria.

Discography

Studio albums

Extended plays

Singles

As lead artist

As featured artist

Awards and nominations

AIR Awards
The Australian Independent Record Awards (commonly known informally as AIR Awards) is an annual awards night to recognise, promote and celebrate the success of Australia's Independent Music sector.

! 
|-
| AIR Awards of 2021
| This Is What Happiness Looks Like
| Best Independent Soul/R&B Album or EP
| 
|

APRA Awards 
The APRA Awards are held in Australia and New Zealand by the Australasian Performing Right Association to recognise songwriting skills, sales and airplay performance by its members annually.

! 
|-
| APRA Music Awards of 2018
| "Mind Made Up" by Cookin' on 3 Burners (featuring Kylie Auldist) 
| Dance Work of the Year
| 
| 
|-

Music Victoria Awards
The Music Victoria Awards (previously known as The Age EG Awards and The Age Music Victoria Awards) are an annual awards night celebrating Victorian music.

|-
| rowspan="2" | Music Victoria Awards of 2013
| herself
| Best Female Artist
| 
|-
| Still Life
| Best Soul, Funk, R'n'B and Gospel Album
| 
|-
| rowspan="2" | Music Victoria Awards of 2016
| herself
| Best Female Artist
| 
|-
| Family Tree
| Best Soul, Funk, R'n'B or Gospel Album
|  
|-
| 2021 Music Victoria Awards
| herself
| Best Solo Act
|

References

External links
Official website

Living people
20th-century Australian women singers
21st-century Australian women singers
Australian soul singers
Funk singers
1986 births